Chetan Shashital (Konkani: चेतन शाशितल Cētana Śāśitala), born 1968 in Mumbai, India, also known as Chetan Sashital or The Big C for his expertise in the voice-acting industry) is an Indian actor, voice actor and singer, who is mostly recognized for working in the dubbing industry. Chetan received Newsmakers Achievers Awards in 2021.

Dubbing career
He has been giving voices to animation, for local Indian productions. He has also performed Hindi-dubbing for foreign productions, such as Baloo the Bear from Talespin and The Jungle Book 2 and also for Genie from Disney's Aladdin, that was dubbed and aired on Disney Channel India in 2005.

Shashital has also dubbed for Bollywood actors. He is considered to be official dubbing artist for Bollywood actor, Amitabh Bachchan, as well as for such other Bollywood actors as Salman Khan, Sunny Deol, Sanjay Dutt and Dharmendra.

Dubbing roles

Animated series

Live action films

Animated films

See also
Dubbing (filmmaking)
List of Indian Dubbing Artists

References

1968 births
Living people
Male actors from Mumbai
Indian male voice actors
Male actors in Hindi cinema
Indian male singers
Male actors in Hindi television
20th-century Indian male actors